Spastic paraplegia 14 (autosomal recessive) is a protein that in humans is encoded by the SPG14 gene.

References

Further reading 

 

Proteins